Llantrisant (Welsh for "Parish of the Three Saints") is a hamlet in Anglesey, Wales. It is in the community of Tref Alaw.

Its parish church is dedicated to Saints Afran, Ieuan, and Sanan. The parish's former church is now a protected building. Browne Willis and Sabine Baring-Gould considered "Afran" to be a corruption of Afan, a saint of Ceredigion and Brecknockshire. (The 16th-century Peniarth MS 147 concurs, listing the church as dedicated to "Sannan and Afan and Evan".) St Afan was related to the Cuneddan dynasty of Gwynedd and was claimed as an ancestor by a 10th-century Ieuan martyred by Viking raiders.

References

External links 
photos of Llantrisant and surrounding area on geograph

Villages in Anglesey
Tref Alaw